was a Japanese daimyō of the early Edo period. Also known as Denzaburō (伝三郎). Inherited headship of the Nomi-Matsudaira (能見松平) from his father, Matsudaira Shigeyoshi. He served as a retainer first to Tokugawa Ieyasu, fighting at Komaki-Nagakute, and later was assigned to Ieyasu's sixth son Tadateru as a senior retainer. Following the dissolution of Tadateru's domain, Shigekatsu was made daimyō of the Sekiyado Domain in Shimōsa Province. Soon afterward, in 1619, he was transferred to the Yokosuka Domain, in Tōtōmi Province, rated at 26,000 koku. At this time, he also served as warden of Ieyasu's castle at Sunpu. During his career, he acquired a court rank of "junior 5th lower grade", as well as the titles of  Echizen no Kami 越前守 and Ōsumi no Kami 大隅守.

References
Rekishi Dokuhon January 2006 issue: "Tokugawa Shōgun-ke to Matsudaira Ichizoku"

|-

|-

1549 births
1620 deaths
Tokugawa clan
Fudai daimyo